Fang, Yingchao (traditional Chinese:方穎超 ; simplified Chinese: 方颖超; born 1982-08-03 in Shanghai) is a male Chinese volleyball player. He was part of the gold medal-winning team at the 2005 National League.

He competed for Team China at the 2008 Summer Olympics in Beijing.

References
Profile

1982 births
Living people
Olympic volleyball players of China
Volleyball players from Shanghai
Volleyball players at the 2008 Summer Olympics
Chinese men's volleyball players
21st-century Chinese people